The Real Housewives of Durban (abbreviated RHODurban) is a South African reality television series that premiered on 29 January 2021, on Showmax. 

The show is developed as the 24th international installment of the American The Real Housewives franchise and the second installment of the franchise set in South Africa. The Real Housewives of Durban focuses on the personal and professional lives of several women living in Durban, South Africa.

The current third season cast consists of Sorisha Naidoo, Annie Mthembu, Nonku Williiams, JoJo Robinson, Slindile Wendy Ndlovu, Mbaliyesizwe Ngiba, and Maria Valaskatzis. Previously-featured cast members include original housewives Kgomotso Ndungane, Ayanda Ncwane, and Nonkanyiso Conco; and subsequent housewives Londiwe Zulu and Thobile Khumalo Mseleku.

Overview & casting

Episodes

Season 1 (2021)

Season 2 (2022)

References

External links 

 Official Program Page

South African television series based on American television series
2018 South African television series debuts
South African reality television series
Durban
Women in South Africa
Culture of Durban
English-language Showmax original programming